Beauty and Bullets is a 1928 American silent Western film directed by Ray Taylor and written by George H. Plympton and Carl Krusada. The film stars Ted Wells, Duane Thompson, Jack Kenny and Wilbur Mack. The film was released on December 16, 1928, by Universal Pictures.

Plot
Joe Kemp (Jack Kenny) and his gang attempt a robbery on the express company's payroll, only to be thwarted by Bill Allen (Ted Wells).  Bill recognizes one of the bandits as Frank Crawford (Wilbur Mack), the brother of his sweetheart, Mary Crawford (Duane Thompson).  After breaking up the robbery attempt, Bill attempts to take the payroll home with him for safekeeping, but Kemp's gang jumps him and makes off with the money.  Bill eventually brings the gang to justice and asks to have Frank remanded into his custody.

Cast     
 Ted Wells as Bill Allen
 Duane Thompson as Mary Crawford
 Jack Kenny as Joe Kemp
 Wilbur Mack as Frank Crawford

References

External links
 

1928 films
1928 Western (genre) films
Universal Pictures films
Films directed by Ray Taylor
American black-and-white films
Silent American Western (genre) films
Films with screenplays by George H. Plympton
1920s English-language films
1920s American films